This is a list of characters in the poem Metamorphoses by Ovid. It contains more than 200 characters, summaries of their roles, and information on where they appear. The descriptions vary in length and comprehensiveness, upgrading characters who were actually metamorphosed, who play a significant role, or about whom a certain background knowledge is required to understand the Metamorphoses. The major Roman gods in general play significant roles in all of the stories, but only their attributes are listed under their own name—their specific roles are summarized under the individual involved characters' names (e.g. Apollo's role in the myth of Hyacinthus is listed under Hyacinthus).

Characters

See also

 After Ovid: New Metamorphoses
 Cultural influence of Metamorphoses
 Latin literature

Links
 List of characters with images and bibliography

References
Citations

Bibliography